Ocna ("the salt mine") may refer to several places in Romania:

Ocna Mureș, a town in Alba County
Ocna Sibiului, a town in Sibiu County
Ocnele Mari, a town in Vâlcea County
Târgu Ocna, a town in Bacău County
Ocna de Fier, a commune in Caraș-Severin County
Ocna Șugatag, a commune in Maramureș County
Ocna de Jos and Ocna de Sus, villages in Praid Commune, Harghita County
Ocna Dejului, a village in Dej city, Cluj County

and to:

Ocna, the Romanian name for Vikno, Zastavna Raion, Ukraine